David Flood was the organist and master of the cathedral choristers at Canterbury Cathedral, a position he held for 32 years from 1988 to 2020. He is a Fellow of the Royal College of Organists.

In 1978, he was appointed assistant organist at Canterbury Cathedral. He spent two years at Lincoln Cathedral from 1986, returning to Canterbury as master of choristers from 1988.

He is a visiting professor at Canterbury Christ Church University and a visiting fellow of St John's College, Durham.

References

Living people
English choral conductors
British male conductors (music)
English classical organists
British male organists
Cathedral organists
21st-century British conductors (music)
21st-century organists
21st-century British male musicians
Year of birth missing (living people)
Male classical organists